Alexander Peden (162626 January 1686), also known as "Prophet Peden", was one of the leading figures in the Covenanter movement in Scotland.

Life
Peden was born at Auchincloich Farm near Sorn, Ayrshire, about 1626, and was educated at the University of Glasgow. He was a teacher at Tarbolton and then ordained minister of New Luce in Galloway in 1660.

His name can also be spelled Peathine or Pethein. He was born in Auchencloich in the parish of Sorn about 1626. He was the son of a small proprietor. He was possibly the Alexander Peden who was the restored heir of his grandfather in Hillhead of Sorn, 16 March 1648, and on the same day heir of Auchinlonfuird. 

Of his early training, there is no clear record, but he may have attended the parish school of Mauchline, and he was a student at Glasgow University from 1643 to 1648. For a time he acted as schoolmaster, precentor, and session-clerk at Tarbolton, and, according to Wodrow, was employed in a similar capacity at Fenwick. 

As he was about to receive license from the Presbytery of Ayr, an accusation of immorality was raised against him, but was found to be false. In 1659 he was ordained to this charge, and was deprived by Act of Parliament 11 June, and Decreet of Privy Council 1 October 1662. When he preached his farewell sermon, he is said to have occupied the pulpit till nightfall, and on leaving it, to have knocked three times on the door with his Bible, saying, "I arrest thee in my Master's name, that none enter thee but such as come by the door, as I have done."

Following his ejectment, Peden became perhaps the most celebrated field preacher of his time. He wandered all over the south of Scotland, obtaining by his figurative and oracular style of address and his supposed prophetic gifts an extraordinary influence over the people, which was further increased by his hardships, perils, and numerous hairbreadth escapes.

After the restoration of Charles II, Peden had to leave his parish under Middleton's Ejectment Act in 1663. For ten years he wandered far and wide, bringing comfort and succour to his co-religionists, and often very narrowly escaping capture, spending some of his time in Ireland. To hide his identity, Peden took to wearing a cloth mask and wig, which are now on display in Edinburgh's Museum of Scotland.  On 25 January 1666, he was denounced as a rebel, and was excepted from the pardon after the Pentland Rising. On 16 August 1667, he was declared a fugitive.  He fled to Ireland in 1670, but returned in 1673.

In June 1673, while holding a conventicle at Knockdow near Ballantrae, Ayrshire, he was captured by Major William Cockburn and condemned by the Privy Council to four years and three months' imprisonment on the Bass Rock and a further fifteen months in the Edinburgh Tolbooth. He was confined there from 26 June 1673 to 9 October 1677, when he was removed to the Edinburgh Tolbooth, where he remained until December 1678. A petition for liberation was refused, and he was sentenced instead to perpetual banishment. In December 1678, he and 60 others were sentenced to banishment to the American plantations. They were transported by ship to London, where they were to be transferred to an American ship. The American captain of the ship which was chartered to convey Peden and his companions to the Virginia plantations, however, on discovering they were being banished for their religious opinions, not as convicts, declined to take them aboard, and they were set at liberty. From London, Peden found his way back to Scotland, and again to the north of Ireland. 

In 1682, Peden performed the wedding ceremony of John Brown and his second wife, Isabel Weir. He told Isabel after the ceremony, "You have a good man to be your husband, but you will not enjoy him long; prize his company, and keep linen by you to be his winding sheet, for you will need it when ye are not looking for it, and it will be a bloody one". On the night of 30 April or morning of 1 May 1685, troops commanded by Captain John Graham of Claverhouse shot John Brown for his refusal to take the 1684 Oath of Abjuration or to swear not to rise in arms against the king. This oath did not require one to proclaim the king, rather than Christ, as the head of the church. However, it would have been understood by a Covenanter to be a promise not to resist the king's claimed supremacy, ecclesiastical as well as civil. Peden was 11 miles away. He prayed with the family of John Muirhead in his home, "Lord, when wilt Thou avenge Brown's blood? O, let Brown's blood be precious in Thy sight." Peden told them of his vision of Brown's wife weeping over his corpse and of Claverhouse killing John Brown.

Death 

Peden's privations and anxieties had gradually undermined his health. Resolving to spend his last days in his native district, he found shelter in a cave on the River Lugar in the parish of Sorn, near his brother's farm just north of Ochiltree part of Auchinleck Estate. Having a presentiment that he had not many hours to live, he left the cave one evening and went to his brother's farm, where he died on 28 January 1686. He was buried in the Boswell aisle of Auchinleck Church. 

Forty days after, a troop of dragoons from Sorn Castle took his corpse two miles to Cumnock gallows, and were about to hang it up in chains. However, William Crichton, 2nd Earl of Dumfries, objected, so they buried it at the foot of the gallows. In 1891 a monument was erected to mark the spot. After the 1688 Glorious Revolution, the inhabitants of the parish of Cumnock, in token of their esteem for Peden, abandoned their ancient burial-place, and formed a new one round the gallows hill. 

He was the most eminent and revered of all the Scottish covenanting preachers, and his influence upon the mass of the people was so great that they gave him the name of "The Prophet," and were accustomed to regard him as almost possessed of the prophetic afflatus. Peden receives a good deal of attention in Jack Deere's book Surprised by the Voice of God, which records prophetic and other charismatic gifts practiced by historical reformed figures.

Alexander Peden Stone 

The Alexander Peden Stone south of Harthill Shotts was one of the places where Rev. Alexander Peden and others were said to have preached to Covenanters. The monument was erected around 1866 and is maintained by a local Covenanters' committee. The stone on which the monument is mounted would have been used as the plinth by preachers.

Bibliography
The Lord's Trumpet sounding an Alarm against Scotland by Warning of a Bloody Sword; being the substance of a Preface and two Prophetical Sermons preached at Glenluce, Anno 1682, by that great Scottish Prophet, Mr. Alexander Peden, late Minister of the Gospel at New Glenluce in Galloway,' was published at Glasgow in 1739, and reprinted in 1779.
Letters to Mr Patrick Simson (and others)
The Life and Prophecies of Alexander Peden by Patrick Walker
Histories of Kirkton and Wodrow
Howie's Scottish Worthies
New Statistical Account of Scotland
Hew Scott's Fasti Eccles. Scot. i. 168
Scott's Old Mortality, note 18
Watson's Life and Times of Peden, Glasgow, 1881.
Reid's Ireland, ii.
Six Saints of the Covenant, ed. by D. Hay Fleming pp. 45–178
Johnston's Alexander Peden, the Prophet of the Covenant, and Treasury of the Scottish Covenant
Todd's Homes, Haunts, and Battlefields of the Covenanters
Jean L. Watson's Life and Times of Peden
Hewat's Peden the Prophet
Carslaw's Exiles of the Covenant
Tombstone
Dictionary of National Biography
Biographia Presbyteriana

See also
Peden's Cave, Craigie

References

External links

Peden's Pulpit video
Video footage of Alexander Peden's Memorial.
Dunton Cove, Covenanter's Hiding Place.
Peden's Cave video footage

1626 births
1686 deaths
People from East Ayrshire
Peden, Prophet
17th-century Presbyterian ministers
Scottish prisoners and detainees
17th-century Ministers of the Church of Scotland
Covenanting Prisoners of the Bass Rock